Visitors to Uruguay must obtain a visa from one of the Uruguayan diplomatic missions unless they come from one of the visa exempt countries.

Visa policy map

Visa policy
Holders of passports of the following 85 jurisdictions can visit Uruguay without a visa for up to 90 days (unless otherwise stated and extendable once except for the citizens of Argentina and Russia):

ID - citizens of these countries may cross the border with an ID card only.
1 - including all classes of British nationals.
2 - for a maximum stay of 30 days.
3 - for a maximum stay of 90 days within 180-day period.
4 - for holders of a MSAR passport or a MSAR Travel Permit.
5 - When the reason for the trip is not tourism, work Or with the intention of staying in the country for a period longer than that established (90 days),The procedure must be carried out with the corresponding prior consultation.

Visa is not required for airline crew members, and citizens of any country who were born in Uruguay as per their travel document.

Holders of diplomatic or official/service passports of Albania, Angola, Azerbaijan, Belarus, Cambodia, Cuba, Dominican Republic, Egypt, India, Indonesia, Morocco, Namibia, Palestine, Suriname, Thailand, Tunisia and Vietnam as well as holders of diplomatic passports of China do not require a visa. Nationals of China holding passports for public affairs do not require a visa for a maximum stay of 90 days.

Chinese common passports holders do not require a visa to visit Uruguay if they meet 3 requirements. 1. At least 6 months before the passport expires. 2.holding valid multiple-entry visas ( or visa valid for over 18 months) in the US, Canada, Schengen Area or UK. 3. Enter through Colonia Port, Port of Montevideo or Carrasco International Airport only.

See also

Visa requirements for Uruguayan citizens

References

External links
Uruguayan Ministry of Foreign Affairs (Spanish)
Dirección Nacional de Migraciones (Spanish)

Uruguay
Foreign relations of Uruguay